The 2015–16 Washington Huskies women's basketball team represented the University of Washington during the 2015–16 NCAA Division I women's basketball season. The Huskies, led by third year head coach Mike Neighbors, played their home games at Alaska Airlines Arena and were members of the Pac-12 Conference. They finished the season 26–11, 11–7 in Pac-12 play to finish in fifth place. They advanced to the semifinals of the Pac-12 women's tournament where they lost Oregon State. They received an at-large bid of the NCAA women's tournament where they defeated Penn and Maryland in the first and second rounds, Kentucky in the Sweet Sixteen, and Pac-12 member Stanford in the Elite Eight to reach the Final Four for the first time in school history. They lost to Syracuse in the Final Four.

Roster

Schedule

|-
!colspan=9 style="background:#363c74; color:#e8d3a2;" | Exhibition

|-
!colspan=12 style="background:#363c74; color:#e8d3a2;"| Non-conference regular season

|-
!colspan=12 style="background:#363c74; color:#e8d3a2;"| Pac-12 regular season

|-
!colspan=9 style="background:#363c74;" | Pac-12 Women's Tournament

|-
!colspan=9 style="background:#363c74;" | NCAA Women's Tournament

Rankings
2015–16 NCAA Division I women's basketball rankings

See also
2015–16 Washington Huskies men's basketball team

References

Washington
Washington Huskies women's basketball seasons
Washington
NCAA Division I women's basketball tournament Final Four seasons
Washington
Washington
Washington